Jordi Camí (Terrassa, 1952) is Professor of Pharmacology (specialist in Clinical Pharmacology) at Pompeu Fabra University, General Director of the Barcelona Biomedical Research Park (PRBB), and Vicepresident of the Pasqual Maragall Foundation.

He has been the promoter and first director of the Pasqual Maragall Foundation between 2008 and 2020. His scientific activity has been focused on the field of Neurosciences  (drug dependence, cognition), having explored other fields such as Bibliometry, Evaluation and Scientific Policy. His academic activity has been carried out between the Autonomous University of Barcelona (UAB)  and the Pompeu Fabra University  (UPF),  having held the positions of Delegate of the Rector, Dean and Director of the department. At the UPF, he promoted Biology studies and the creation and development of the Department of Experimental and Health Sciences.  He was the Director of the IMIM (Hospital del Mar Medical Research Institute) between 1985 and 2005. He has also participated in the creation of new research centers (CRG, CMRB) and, in particular, the PRBB, which he founded and runs since 2005. He founded the no longer edited journal Quark (1995-2007).

In 2017 he was elected a full member of the Biological Sciences section of the Institute for Catalan Studies (Institut d’Estudis Catalans -IEC). 
Among the various awards won are the honorable mention of the Reina Sofia Research Award in 1990 and the award of the Narcís Monturiol medal by the Generalitat of Catalonia to scientific and technological merit in 2000. Among other institutions, from 2005 to 2012 he was a Member of the Health Advisory Council of the Social Ministry of Health of Spain and a member of its Executive Committee, and from 2007 to 2012 he was a member of the Bioethics Committee of Spain. He has also been the first President of CIR-CAT (Committee for the Integrity of Research in Catalonia).

References

External links 
Barcelona Biomedical Research Park (PRBB)
Pasqual Maragall Foundation
Virtual Mind Laboratory
Jordi Camí personal web page

1952 births
Living people
People from Terrassa
Spanish non-fiction writers
Academic staff of Pompeu Fabra University